Boon Tat Street is in the Downtown Core in the Central Area of Singapore. The street extends from Amoy Street at its western end to the junction of Shenton Way and Raffles Quay.

A portion of the street adjacent to Lau Pa Sat is closed in the evening for stalls selling satay. Boon Tat Street has been labeled as a heritage site by the Urban Redevelopment Authority.

The Hokkiens called this street as ma cho kiong pi (beside the ma cho temple), referring to the Thian Hock Keng temple at Telok Ayer Street.

See also
Nagore Durgha
Telok Ayer Chinese Methodist Church

References

Further reading 
 

Roads in Singapore
Downtown Core (Singapore)
Outram, Singapore
Chinatown, Singapore